Oleksandr Blizniuchenko (born 27 May 1951) is a Ukrainian sports shooter. He competed in two events at the 1996 Summer Olympics.

References

External links
 

1951 births
Living people
Ukrainian male sport shooters
Olympic shooters of Ukraine
Shooters at the 1996 Summer Olympics
Sportspeople from Kharkiv